Sex-based statistics regarding the rate of infant mortality by administrative divisions in the People's Republic of China have been collected.  Disparity in rates of female infant mortality by Chinese administrative divisions has been noted in public health statistics since the first modern Chinese census in 1982 which showed significantly higher rates of female infant mortality. Already abnormal female infant mortality deteriorated further in censuses held in 1989 and 2000.

Census data

2010
The infant mortality rates by administrative division from the 6th National Population Census held in 2010 are adjusted upwards according to a methodology by the authors Professors Hong Rongqing and Zeng Xianxin of Capital University of Economics and Business in "Infant Mortality Reported in the 2010 Census: Bias and Adjustment", published in Population Research in March 2013. The authors estimate that the infant mortality rate from the 6th Census is severely underreported by about 78%. Undereporting of the infant mortality rate in the 6th Census is also the conclusion in a note analyzing the 6th Census by the China offices of UNICEF and UNFPA.

2000
Infant mortality rates are based on the 5th National Population Census held in 2000 and calculations of male/female differences are from the medical journal article "Gender Difference of Infant Mortality and its Disparity among Provinces in China" published in the Chinese Journal of Health Statistics in April 2013.

See also 
 Female infanticide in China
 Health in China

References

Gender
Gender in Asia
Demographics of China